22 Golden Guitar Greats is a compilation album by guitarist Bert Weedon released in 1976 on the Warwick label. It reached number one in the UK Albums Chart in November 1976 making Weedon the first solo guitarist to have a number one album. It kept Stevie Wonder's Songs in the Key of Life at number two. The album also received both a gold disc and a platinum disc for sales.

Track listing

References

1976 compilation albums
Bert Weedon compilation albums
Warwick Records (United Kingdom) compilation albums
Albums produced by Brian Matthew